The Jari River, or Jary River, is a northern tributary of the Amazon River on the border between the states of Pará and Amapá in northeastern Brazil. It is in the most downstream regions of the Amazon Basin and borders the Guiana Highlands and the Guianas to the northwest.

Course

The river flows through the Uatuma-Trombetas moist forests ecoregion.
The source of the Jari is in the south of the Tumuk Humak Mountains, and its mouth is at the Amazon River between the municipalities of Almeirim in Pará and Vitória do Jari in Amapá. Ilha Grande de Gurupá, the second-largest island of the Amazon River Delta, is opposite of the mouth of the Jari River.
Part of the river's basin is in the Maicuru Biological Reserve.

The Jari River forms the western boundary of the Tumucumaque Mountains National Park.
Below the park it forms the western boundary of the   Rio Iratapuru Sustainable Development Reserve, created in 1997.
For part of its course it runs through the Jari Ecological Station.
Small numbers of people have settled along the river here, built houses and cleared fields.

Tributaries

 Iratapuru River
 Iratapina River
 Noucouru River
 Mapiri River
 Cuc River
 Culari River
 Curapi River
 Ximim-Ximim River
 Mapaoni River

See also 
 Jari project

References

Rivers of Amapá
Rivers of Pará
Tributaries of the Amazon River